Revolutionary Socialist Alternative was a Trotskyist political party in Bolivia.  It was affiliated to the Committee for a Workers' International (CWI). It produced the newspaper La Voz Obrera (Workers' Voice).

It was based in Cochabamba, providing an information board in the central plaza and had organised the People’s Plaza Defense Committee to defend social movements in the city against attacks by right-wing thugs. Members have also played a role in supporting the hunger strike of the Sindicato Mixto de Trabajadores Petroleros Gualberto Villarroel union leaders demanding back their jobs.

On April 12 2015 the members of the ASR decided to break with the CIT and to leave the ASR.

References

Committee for a Workers' International
Communist parties in Bolivia
Far-left politics in Bolivia
Political parties with year of establishment missing
Trotskyist organisations in Bolivia